The Blue Monday Remixes is a 2002 vinyl EP released by Norwegian electronic band Flunk on Guidance Recordings. The title track is a cover of New Order's "Blue Monday. In 2003, a CD version was released with the additional track "Miss World".

Track listing

A Side
 Blue Monday (Jori Hulkkonen Remix 1)
 Blue Monday (Jori Hulkkonen Remix 2, where parts of
Depeche Mode's composition "StrangeLove" are played)

B Side
 Blue Monday (Blue States Remix)
 Blue Monday

2002 EPs
2002 remix albums
Flunk albums
Remix EPs